Misikhu is a rural town on the southern slopes of Mt Elgon, in Bungoma County, Kenya. Located ten kilometres north of Webuye towards Kitale, Misikhu is both an administrative and commercial town.

Population
Misikhu is populated by the Tachoni and Bukusu tribes although there are a number of other smaller Luhya clans bordering Misikhu. The widely used dialects are Olutachoni, Lubukusu and Swahili. Other immigrant communities such as Kikuyu, Luo, Kisii and Kambas are present but in small numbers.

Services
The area is locally known for its schools, which include St. Cecilia Misikhu Girls School, Misikhu R.C Boys, Friends School Magemo and St Francis Secondary School, Makemo.

Politics
Misikhu lies in both Webuye East and West Constituencies.

References 

Populated places in Western Province (Kenya)
Bungoma County